A B-cell leukemia is any of several types of lymphoid leukemia which affect B cells.

Types include (with ICD-O code):
 9823/3 - B-cell chronic lymphocytic leukemia/small lymphocytic lymphoma
 9826/3 - Acute lymphoblastic leukemia, mature B-cell type
 9833/3 - B-cell prolymphocytic leukemia
 9835/3-9836/3 - Precursor B lymphoblastic leukemia
 9940/3 - Hairy cell leukemia

See also
 T-cell leukemia
 B-cell lymphoma

References

External links 

Lymphocytic leukemia